Podocarpus celatus is a species of conifer in the family Podocarpaceae. It is found in the Amazon rainforest.

Description
Trees 10–25 m high; with narrowly elliptic or oblong leaves, 5–15 cm long and 1–2 cm wide; male cones 2–3 cm long; seeds 5–6 mm long.

Distribution and habitat
Podocarpus celatus grows in lowland rainforests and low montane rainforests between 130 m and 1400 m of elevation in Brazil, Colombia, Peru, Ecuador, Venezuela and Bolivia.

Ecology
This species grows on poor soil types: lateritic, sandstone and white sand.

References

External links
 Herbarium sheet with branch collected in Peru (1)
 Herbarium sheet with branch collected in Peru (2)

celatus
Least concern plants
Trees of Bolivia
Trees of Peru
Trees of Venezuela
Trees of Ecuador
Trees of Colombia
Trees of Brazil
Taxonomy articles created by Polbot
Taxa named by David John de Laubenfels